Marion or Marian Anderson may refer to:
 Marion T. Anderson (1839–1904), American soldier and Medal of Honor recipient
 Marian Anderson (1897–1993), American singer
 Marion Anderson (politician) (born c. 1914), Canadian politician
 Marion Anderson (photographer) (1920–2002), American press photographer
 Marian Anderson (Insaints) (1968–2001), American punk rock singer, lead singer of the Insaints

See also
Marianne Andersen (born 1980), Norwegian orienteering competitor